Bristol Township is a township in Worth County, Iowa, USA.

History
Bristol Township was established in 1857.

References

Townships in Worth County, Iowa
Townships in Iowa
1857 establishments in Iowa
Populated places established in 1857